Ralph Vernon Scott (September 26, 1894 – August 16, 1936) was an American football player and coach.  He played professionally in the first American Football League and the National Football League (NFL) for the Chicago Staleys/Bears and the New York Yankees. Scott was a member of the 1921 Chicago Staleys APFA Championship team. In 1926 C. C. Pyle, began the AFL after a dispute with the NFL over the terms of granting himself a league franchise in New York City. Pyle eventually hired Scott as a player-coach the Yankees for an undisclosed amount of money.

Prior to playing professionally, Scott played college football at the University of Wisconsin. In 1920 Scott helped the Badgers to a 6–1 record. That year, he was selected to the All-Big Ten Conference football team and was a consensus All-American.

References

Additional sources
 

1894 births
1936 deaths
American football guards
American football tackles
Chicago Bears players
Chicago Staleys players
New York Yankees (NFL) coaches
New York Yankees (NFL) players
Wisconsin Badgers football players
All-American college football players
People from Portage County, Wisconsin
Players of American football from Wisconsin